Thomasia paniculata is a species of flowering plant in the family Malvaceae and is endemic to the south-west of Western Australia. It is a spreading shrub with heart-shaped to narrowly egg-shaped leaves and pinkish-mauve flowers.

Description
The edges of the leaves are regularly notched and both sides are covered with scattered star-shaped hairs. The sepals are pinkish-mauve, densely covered with star-shaped hairs and joined for about half their length. Flowering occurs from September to December or from January to March.

Taxonomy
Thomasia paniculata was first formally described in 1839 by John Lindley in A Sketch of the Vegetation of the Swan River Colony. The specific epithet (paniculata) refers to the branching habit of some of the flowering racemes.

Distribution and habitat
This thomasia usually grows as an understorey plant in moist places in karri, jarrah and tingle forest, mainly between Perth and Albany in the Esperance Plains, Jarrah Forest, Swan Coastal Plain and Warren bioregions of south-western Western Australia.

Conservation status
Thomasia paniculata is listed as "not threatened" by the Government of Western Australia Department of Biodiversity, Conservation and Attractions.

References

Rosids of Western Australia
Plants described in 1839
paniculata
Taxa named by John Lindley